Lauren Ashley Wenger (born March 11, 1984, in Long Beach, California) is an American water polo player for the University of Southern California, who received the 2006 Peter J. Cutino Award as the best collegiate water polo player among Division I NCAA teams. Her position is two-meter defender.

Wenger was All-American at Wilson Classical High School in Long Beach, California, and earned a scholar-athlete award all four years. In 2002, she played on the US National Team that won the Pan-American Championship. From 2003 to 2006 she attended USC, where in her senior year she led her Trojans team in steals and assists, becoming no. 8 all-time scorer with 127 career goals. Wenger is a member of the U.S National Team, helping Team USA win silver at the 2005 Water Polo World Championship. At USC, she majored in policy, planning and development.

Career
She played her first international season for the Greek powerhouse Olympiacos in Greece in 2006–2007.

At the 2008 China Summer Olympic games, she and the American team lost 8-9 in the championship game to the Netherlands and took home the silver medal.

In June, 2009, Wenger was named to the USA water polo women's senior national team for the 2009 FINA World Championships.

In August 2012, she won the gold medal in London 2012 Olympic Games with the US team, defeating Spain in the final match.

Awards
In 2019, Wenger was inducted into the USA Water Polo Hall of Fame.

See also
 United States women's Olympic water polo team records and statistics
 List of Olympic champions in women's water polo
 List of Olympic medalists in water polo (women)
 List of world champions in women's water polo
 List of World Aquatics Championships medalists in water polo

References

External links
 
 Lauren Wenger: USC player biography

1984 births
Living people
Sportspeople from Long Beach, California
American female water polo players
Water polo drivers
Water polo players at the 2008 Summer Olympics
Water polo players at the 2012 Summer Olympics
Medalists at the 2008 Summer Olympics
Medalists at the 2012 Summer Olympics
Olympic gold medalists for the United States in water polo
Olympic silver medalists for the United States in water polo
World Aquatics Championships medalists in water polo
Water polo players at the 2007 Pan American Games
Water polo players at the 2011 Pan American Games
Pan American Games medalists in water polo
Pan American Games gold medalists for the United States
Olympiacos Women's Water Polo Team players
USC Trojans women's water polo players
Wilson Classical High School alumni
Medalists at the 2011 Pan American Games